Cambas or Cambás may refer to:

 Cambás, a river of Galicia
 Cambas (Oleiros), a parish in Oleiros, Portugal

 Christian Cambas, Greek DJ and producer
 Jacqueline Cambas, American film editor

See also
 Camba